The United States Court of Appeals for the Ninth Circuit (in case citations, 9th Cir.) is the U.S. federal court of appeals that has appellate jurisdiction over the U.S. district courts in the following federal judicial districts:
 District of Alaska
 District of Arizona
 Central District of California
 Eastern District of California
 Northern District of California
 Southern District of California
 District of Hawaii
 District of Idaho
 District of Montana
 District of Nevada
 District of Oregon
 Eastern District of Washington
 Western District of Washington

The Ninth Circuit also has appellate jurisdiction over the territorial courts for the District of Guam and the District of the Northern Mariana Islands. Additionally, it sometimes handles appeals that originate from American Samoa, which has no district court and partially relies on the District of Hawaii for its federal cases.

Headquartered in San Francisco, California, the Ninth Circuit is by far the largest of the 13 U.S. Courts of Appeals, covering a total of nine states and two territories and with 29 active judgeships. The court's regular meeting places are Seattle at the William Kenzo Nakamura United States Courthouse, Portland at the Pioneer Courthouse, San Francisco at the James R. Browning U.S. Court of Appeals Building, and Pasadena at the Richard H. Chambers U.S. Court of Appeals. 

Panels of the court occasionally travel to hear cases in other locations within the circuit. Although the judges travel around the circuit, the court arranges its hearings so that cases from the northern region of the circuit are heard in Seattle or Portland, cases from southern California and Arizona are heard in Pasadena, and cases from northern California, Nevada, Hawaii, and the Pacific territories are heard in San Francisco. Additionally, the court holds yearly sittings in Anchorage and Honolulu. For lawyers who must come and present their cases to the court in person, this administrative grouping of cases helps to reduce the time and cost of travel. Ninth Circuit judges are also appointed by the United States Secretary of the Interior to serve as temporary acting Associate Justices for non-federal appellate sessions at the High Court of American Samoa in Fagatogo.

History 

The Ninth Circuit's large size is due to the dramatic increases in both the population of the western states and the court's geographic jurisdiction that have occurred since the U.S. Congress created the Ninth Circuit in 1891. The court was originally granted appellate jurisdiction over federal district courts in California, Idaho, Montana, Nevada, Oregon, and Washington. As new states and territories were added to the federal judicial hierarchy in the twentieth century, many of those in the West were placed in the Ninth Circuit: the newly acquired Territory of Hawaii in 1900, Arizona upon its admission to the Union in 1912, the Territory of Alaska in 1948, Guam in 1951, and the Commonwealth of the Northern Mariana Islands in 1977.

The Ninth Circuit also had jurisdiction over certain American interests in China, in that it had jurisdiction over appeals from the United States Court for China during the existence of that court from 1906 through 1943.

However, the Philippines was never under the Ninth Circuit's jurisdiction. Congress never created a federal district court in the Philippines from which the Ninth Circuit could hear appeals. Instead, appeals from the Supreme Court of the Philippines were taken directly to the Supreme Court of the United States.

In 1979, the Ninth Circuit became the first federal judicial circuit to set up a Bankruptcy Appellate Panel as authorized by the Bankruptcy Reform Act of 1978.

The cultural and political jurisdiction of the Ninth Circuit is just as varied as the land within its geographical borders. In a dissenting opinion in a rights of publicity case involving the Wheel of Fortune star Vanna White, Circuit Judge Alex Kozinski sardonically noted that "[f]or better or worse, we are the Court of Appeals for the Hollywood Circuit." Judges from more remote parts of the circuit note the contrast between legal issues confronted by populous states such as California and those confronted by rural states such as Alaska, Idaho, Montana, and Nevada.

Judge Andrew J. Kleinfeld, who maintains his judicial chambers in Fairbanks, Alaska, wrote in a letter in 1998: "Much federal law is not national in scope....It is easy to make a mistake construing these laws when unfamiliar with them, as we often are, or not interpreting them regularly, as we never do."

Criticism

Rate of overturned decisions 
From 1999 to 2008, of the Ninth Circuit Court rulings that were reviewed by the Supreme Court, 20% were affirmed, 19% were vacated, and 61% were reversed; the median reversal rate for all federal appellate courts was 68.29% for the same period. From 2010 to 2015, of the cases it accepted to review, the Supreme Court reversed around 79% of the cases from the Ninth Circuit, ranking its reversal rate third among the circuits; the median reversal rate for all federal circuits for the same time period was around 70 percent.

Some argue the court's high percentage of reversals is illusory, resulting from the circuit hearing more cases than the other circuits. This results in the Supreme Court reviewing a smaller proportion of its cases, letting stand the vast majority of its cases.

However, a detailed study in 2018 reported by Brian T. Fitzpatrick, a law professor at Vanderbilt University, looked at how often a federal circuit court was reversed for every thousand cases it terminated on the merits between 1994 and 2015.  The study found that the Ninth Circuit's decisions were reversed at a rate of 2.50 cases per thousand, which was by far the highest rate in the country, with the Sixth Circuit second as 1.73 cases per thousand. Fitzgerald also noted that the 9th Circuit was unanimously reversed more than three times as often as the least reversed circuits and over 20% more often than the next closest circuit.

Size of the court 

Many commentators have argued that the Ninth Circuit faces several adverse consequences of its large size, such as "unwieldly size, procedural inefficiencies, jurisprudential unpredictability, and unusual en banc process."

Chief among these is the Ninth Circuit's unique rules concerning the composition of an en banc court. In other circuits, en banc courts are composed of all active circuit judges, plus (depending on the rules of the particular court) any senior judges who took part in the original panel decision. By contrast, in the Ninth Circuit it is impractical for 29 or more judges to take part in a single oral argument and deliberate on a decision en masse. The court thus provides for a limited en banc review by the Chief Judge and a panel of 10 randomly selected judges. This means that en banc reviews may not actually reflect the views of the majority of the court and indeed may not include any of the three judges involved in the decision being reviewed in the first place. The result, according to detractors, is a high risk of intracircuit conflicts of law where different groupings of judges end up delivering contradictory opinions. That is said to cause uncertainty in the district courts and within the bar. However, en banc review is a relatively rare occurrence in all circuits and Ninth Circuit rules provide for full en banc review in limited circumstances.

All recently proposed splits would leave at least one circuit with 21 judges, only two fewer than the 23 that the Ninth Circuit had when the limited en banc procedure was first adopted. In other words, after a split at least one of the circuits would still be using  limited en banc courts.

In March 2007, Associate Justices Anthony Kennedy and Clarence Thomas testified before a House Appropriations subcommittee that the consensus among the justices of the Supreme Court of the United States was that the Ninth Circuit was too large and unwieldy and should be split.

Congressional officials, legislative commissions, and interest groups have all submitted proposals to divide the Ninth Circuit such as:
 Ninth Circuit Court of Appeals Reorganization Act of 1993, H.R. 3654
 Final Report of the Commission on Structural Alternatives for the Federal Courts of Appeals
 Ninth Circuit Court of Appeals of Reorganization Act of 2003, S. 562
 Ninth Circuit Court of Appeals Judgeship and Reorganization Act of 2003, H.R. 2723
 Ninth Circuit Judgeship and Reorganization Act of 2004, S. 878 (reintroduced as the Ninth Circuit Judgeship and Reorganization Act of 2005, H.R. 211, and co-sponsored by House Majority Leader Tom DeLay)
 Circuit Court of Appeals Restructuring and Modernization Act of 2005, S. 1845
 Circuit Court of Appeals Restructuring and Modernization Act of 2007, S. 525
 Ninth Circuit Court of Appeals Judgeship and Reorganization Act of 2017, H.R. 196

The more recent proposals have aimed to redefine the Ninth Circuit to cover California, Hawaii, Guam, and the Northern Mariana Islands, and to create a new Twelfth Circuit to cover Alaska, Arizona, Idaho, Montana, Nevada, Oregon, and Washington.

Current composition of the court 
:

Vacancies and pending nominations

List of former judges

Chief judges

Succession of seats

Case law 
United States v. Kincade, 379 F.3d 813 (9th Cir. 2004)

See also 
 Courts of California
 Ninth Circuit appointment history
 List of current United States Circuit Judges
 Same-sex marriage in the Ninth Circuit

Notes

References

External links 

 United States Court of Appeals for the Ninth Circuit
 This website includes links to the court's published and unpublished opinions, court-specific rules of appellate procedure, and general operating procedures.
 Ninth Circuit Library
 Recent opinions from FindLaw
 Federal Judicial Center
 Disposition of Supreme Court decisions on certiorari or appeal from state and territory supreme courts, and from federal courts of appeals, 1950–2006

 
Anchorage, Alaska
Billings, Montana
Honolulu
Las Vegas
Los Angeles
Pasadena, California
Phoenix, Arizona
Pocatello, Idaho
Portland, Oregon
Reno, Nevada
San Diego
San Francisco
Seattle
1891 establishments in the United States
Courts and tribunals established in 1891